Darwinia chapmaniana, commonly known as Chapman's bell or Eganu bell, is a plant in the myrtle family Myrtaceae, and is endemic to the south-west of Western Australia. It is a low, rounded, spreading shrub with greyish, hairy leaves and flowers in heads of about 14 small, tubular flowers. The heads are surrounded by long, reddish-yellow, hairy bracts.

Description
Its leaves and inflorescences have a distinct curry scent. The leaves are crowded near the ends of the branches, greyish-green in colour, linear in shape, triangular in cross-section and covered with short hairs.

Flowering occurs between September and November, mainly in October, and is followed by fruit which is a small, non-fleshy nut containing one or two seeds.

Taxonomy
The first formal description of D. chapmaniana was published by Greg Keighery in 2009 in Nuytsia. He collected the type specimen near Coorow. The specific epithet (chapmaniana) honours Charles Chapman, a farmer and who collected the first specimens of this species.

Distribution and habitat
This darwinia is only known to occur in a small area near Coorow where it grows around salt lakes in woodland or shrubland.

Conservation
Darwinia chapmaniana is classified as "Threatened Flora (Declared Rare Flora — Extant)" by the Western Australian Government Department of Parks and Wildlife. It has also been listed as "Endangered" (EN) under the Australian Government Environment Protection and Biodiversity Conservation Act 1999 (EPBC Act). The threats to its survival include land clearing, soil salination, weed invasion and grazing.

References

chapmaniana
Endemic flora of Western Australia
Endangered flora of Australia
Rosids of Western Australia
Myrtales of Australia
Plants described in 2009
Taxa named by Gregory John Keighery